This list of fossil reptiles described in 2014 is a list of new taxa of fossil reptiles that were described during the year 2014, as well as other significant discoveries and events related to reptile paleontology that occurred in 2014.

Ichthyopterygians

Research
 Anatomy, taxonomy and phylogenetic relationships of Cretaceous ophthalmosaurids Simbirskiasaurus birjukovi and Pervushovisaurus bannovkensis are reevaluated by Fischer et al. (2014).

New taxa

Sauropterygians

Lepidosaurs

Newly named rhynchocephalians

Newly named lizards

Newly named snakes

Turtles

Research
 Redescription of the rediscovered holotype of the Jurassic turtle Plesiochelys etalloni is published by Anquetin, Deschamps & Claude (2014).

Newly named turtles

Archosauromorphs

Archosaurs

Basal archosauromorphs

Research
 A redescription of Tasmaniosaurus triassicus is published by Ezcurra (2014).
 A revision of anatomy and phylogenetic relationships of the archosauriform Dorosuchus neoetus is published by Sookias et al. (2014).
 A revision of putative euparkeriids from the Triassic of China is published by Sookias et al. (2014).

New taxa

Other reptiles

References 

2014 in paleontology